Eucalyptus extensa is a species of mallet that is endemic to Western Australia. It has smooth bark, lance-shaped adult leaves, flower buds in groups of seven, yellowish green flowers and hemispherical fruit with the valves extended well beyond the level of the rim.

Description
Eucalyptus extensa is a mallet that typically grows to a height of  but does not form a lignotuber. It has smooth, powdery, grey or grey-brown to green or yellow  bark. Flowering has been recorded in March and October and the flowers are yellowish green.

Taxonomy
Eucalyptus extensa was first formally described in 1991 by the botanists Lawrence Alexander Sidney Johnson and Ken Hill in the journal Telopea, from a specimen collected near the road between Hyden and Norseman. The specific epithet is taken from the Latin word extensus meaning "stretched out or extended" in reference to the long opercula on the buds.

Distribution
This mallet occurs on sandplains and undulating areas along the south of Western Australia in the southern Wheatbelt and south western Goldfields-Esperance regions where it grows in red loam, grey sandy loam and sometimes gravelly soils.

Conservation status
This eucalypt is classified as "not threatened" by the Western Australian Government Department of Parks and Wildlife.

See also
List of Eucalyptus species

References

extensa
Endemic flora of Western Australia
Myrtales of Australia
Eucalypts of Western Australia
Plants described in 1991
Taxa named by Lawrence Alexander Sidney Johnson
Taxa named by Ken Hill (botanist)